Fulde may refer to:

Fulde (Böhme), a river of Lower Saxony, Germany, tributary of the Böhme

People with the surname 
Gordian Fulde (born 1948), Australian emergency medicine specialist
Peter Fulde (born 1936), a physicist working in condensed matter theory and quantum chemistry

German-language surnames
German toponymic surnames